Ayr railway station was a railway station serving the town of Ayr, South Ayrshire, Scotland. The station was originally part of the Glasgow, Paisley, Kilmarnock and Ayr Railway. From October 1850, it became part of the Glasgow and South Western Railway.

History 
The terminus station opened on 5 August 1839, and closed to passengers on 1 July 1857 upon opening of the new Ayr Townhead station.  The station however continued to be used by goods traffic, and in 1899 a viaduct was built to continue the line from here across the river to access the south side of the harbour.

Today almost nothing of the station remains. The stone blocks that held up the 1899 bridge to the harbour can still be seen in the River Ayr, but the bridge itself was removed in 1978.

References

Notes

Sources 
 

Disused railway stations in South Ayrshire
Railway stations in Great Britain opened in 1839
Railway stations in Great Britain closed in 1857
Former Glasgow and South Western Railway stations
1839 establishments in Scotland
1857 disestablishments in Scotland
Railway stations in Ayr